The Ministry of Natural Resources is a ministry of the government of the People's Republic of China which is responsible for natural resources in the country. It was formed on 19 March 2018, taking on the responsibilities of the now-defunct Ministry of Land and Resources, State Bureau of Surveying and Mapping and State Oceanic Administration, with additional responsibilities coming from other departments and ministries.

History 
On March 19, 2018, the Government of the People's Republic of China announced the simultaneous creation of the Ministry of Natural Resources and dissolution of the Ministry of Land and Resources, State Oceanic Administration, and State Bureau of Surveying and Mapping. That same day, Lu Hao was elected Minister of Natural Resources.

Responsibilities 
 Responsibilities of the former Ministry of Land and Resources
 Responsibilities of the former State Oceanic Administration
 Responsibilities of the former State Bureau of Surveying and Mapping
 Responsibilities of organizing and planning the major-function oriented zone (Responsibilities of National Development and Reform Commission) 
 Responsibilities of urban and rural planning management (Responsibilities of Ministry of Housing and Urban-Rural Development)
 Responsibilities of water resources survey and the management of the registration of the right (Responsibilities of Ministry of Water Resources)
 Responsibilities of grassland resources survey and the management of the registration of the right (Responsibilities of Ministry of Agriculture)
 Responsibilities of forest, wetland, national parks, and other resources survey and registration management (Responsibilities of State Forestry and Grassland Administration)

List of ministers

References 

Government ministries of the People's Republic of China
China
China
Ministries established in 2018
2018 establishments in China